The Altiplano is a small elevated valley between Findlay Ridge and Miers Valley. It was named by a New Zealand Geographical Society (NZGS) field party to the area, 1977–78, after the much larger intermontane plateau of the Andes Mountains.

Valleys of Victoria Land
Scott Coast